WDUF was a Country, Bluegrass, and Southern Gospel formatted broadcast radio station licensed to Duffield, Virginia, and served the Duffield/Pennington Gap/Big Stone Gap area.  WDUF was owned and operated by Duffield Broadcasting Company.

References

External links
 Query the FCC's AM station database for WDUF

1986 establishments in Virginia
2007 disestablishments in Virginia
Radio stations established in 1986
Radio stations disestablished in 2007
DUF
Defunct radio stations in the United States
DUF
DUF
Defunct religious radio stations in the United States